NMLS may refer to:

 Nationwide Multi-State Licensing System and Registry, a federal record system for licensing and registration of financial services in the United States.
 Norman Manley Law School, a law school in Jamaica.